Marivani or Mariwani or Meriwani may refer to:
 Marivani-ye Bidgoli
 Marivani-ye Kakiha